Levi Leipheimer (born October 24, 1973) is an American former professional road racing cyclist. He was twice US national champion, winning the time trial title in 1999 and the road race in 2007, and is an Olympic medalist. Leipheimer was born and raised in Butte, Montana and resides in Santa Rosa, California. He is the patron of the widely attended King Ridge GranFondo, a mass participation ride in Sonoma County.

Leipheimer's major career accomplishments include winning the 2007, 2008 and 2009 editions of the Tour of California, the 2011 Tour de Suisse and the 2011 USA Pro Cycling Challenge. His Grand Tour results include 2nd in the 2008 Vuelta a España, and 4th in the 2009 Giro d'Italia. Leipheimer won the bronze medal in the time trial at the 2008 Summer Olympics in Beijing.

The United States Anti-Doping Agency (USADA) announced in October 2012 that Leipheimer would be suspended for his involvement in doping while riding for Saturn, U.S. Postal Service, Rabobank, Gerolsteiner and Astana. Leipheimer accepted a 6-month ban from September 1, 2012 to March 1, 2013 and was stripped of all race results from June 1, 1999 to July 30, 2006, and July 7 to 29, 2007. (This included his third-place finish in the 2007 Tour.)

In May 2013, Leipheimer confirmed his retirement from professional cycling following the termination of his contract with Omega Pharma-Quickstep.

Early life and amateur career
Leipheimer was born and raised in Butte, Montana, where his parents ran a sporting goods store.  As a youth, his main sport was skiing, but he became interested in cycling after a skiing accident led to him directing his career hopes towards cycling.

Maestro Frigas and Einstein (1995–1996)
In 1995 Leipheimer won the Tour of Namur as an intern for the British F.S. Maestro – Frigas team.

1996 doping violation
Leipheimer, riding for Team Einstein, won the 1996 U.S. National Criterium Championships in Grandview Heights, Ohio, but tested positive for ephedrine, a banned substance. He eventually forfeited his title, prize money and national champion's jersey as well as receiving a three-month suspension. Leipheimer's family later claimed that the positive test was not indicative of doping, but rather, the result of his taking allergy medicine Claritin-D to relieve hay fever.

Professional career

Astana (2008–2009)
Leipheimer joined Astana, managed by Johan Bruyneel, former manager of U.S. Postal and Discovery Channel. Astana was banned from the 2008 Tour de France because of doping scandals in the 2007 Tour, although all involved in those scandals had been replaced. Leipheimer created a website to petition, unsuccessfully, for admittance to the 2008 Tour.

Leipheimer won the 2008 Tour of California. At the last minute, Astana was admitted to the Giro d'Italia, and Leipheimer finished 18th, helping teammate Contador to victory. He won the bronze medal at the Beijing 2008 Summer Olympics in the road time trial. Leipheimer won both time trials of the 2008 Vuelta a España, leading the race after the fifth stage, and placed second overall.

Leipheimer began 2009 by winning the Tour of California for the third consecutive year.  He broke away during the final climb of stage 2 and led after the stage. Leipheimer won stage 6, the Solvang individual time trial. Astana teammate Lance Armstrong, in his second race after returning from retirement, rode for Leipheimer. Leipheimer won the 2009 SRAM Tour of the Gila with Astana teammates Chris Horner and Armstrong, who finished second but, as UCI regulations meant that Astana were ineligible for the event, the three rode as Team Mellow Johnny's, named after Armstrong's bike shop.

In May, Leipheimer rode for Astana in the Giro d'Italia and finished 6th overall, the team's best placement. Later, the 2nd-place finisher Danilo Di Luca tested positive for a banned substance and was stripped of his position, moving Leipheimer up to a 5th-place finish in the records.

Riding with Astana in the 2009 Tour de France, Leipheimer broke a wrist in a crash near the end of stage 12, when he was 4th overall, and abandoned the race.

Team RadioShack (2010–2011)

He won his second consecutive SRAM Tour of the Gila in April.  At the 2010 Tour de California Leipheimer finished in third place overall.

Leipheimer was favored to lead the team in California again for 2011, but became the team's chief domestique instead, riding in support of Chris Horner's eventual victory, after the latter posted a stronger time on mountainous stage four into San Jose. Leipheimer also won the stage finishing at the Mount Baldy ski area, and was second in the individual time trial. In his next race, the Tour of Switzerland, Leipheimer won, overhauling the race leader Damiano Cunego by 2 minutes in the final time trial stage, to win the tour by 4 seconds.

Leipheimer won the first edition of the USA Pro Cycling Challenge, winning the first stage and the third stage time trial.

Omega Pharma - Quick-Step (2012)
Leipheimer joined Patrick Lefevere's  team for what was supposed to be the 2012 and 2013 seasons. He started his year by winning the Tour de San Luis in Argentina. However, while on a training ride on the eve of the Vuelta Ciclista al Pais Vasco, he broke his fibula when he collided with a car. He stated that he thought he would die when the accident happened. He returned to competition at the Tour of California, where he won the "Most Courageous" jersey after stage one, in recognition of his return from the serious injury. He finished the race in sixth overall.

Leipheimer followed his California performance with third place overall in the Tour de Suisse. Leipheimer won a stage of the Tour of Utah, and finished third overall in the USA Pro Cycling Challenge, having led the race for one day.

Omega Pharma-Quick Step terminated Leipheimer's contract in October, one week after his testimony to USADA.

Retirement
Leipheimer officially retired from pro cycling in May 2013. As previously noted, Leipheimer had cooperated with USADA in their case against Lance Armstrong, and detailed his own use of performance-enhancing drugs and methods while riding for Saturn, U.S. Postal Service, Rabobank, Gerolsteiner and Astana. In an October 2012 op-ed for the website of The Wall Street Journal ("Why I Doped"), Leipheimer also asserted to have raced the last five years of his career clean.

Leipheimer and four other riders — George Hincapie, Christian Vande Velde, David Zabriskie and Tom Danielson — received six-month suspensions and were stripped of results. Hincapie retired; the others resumed racing in 2013 after serving their suspensions. Leipheimer hoped to do the same when his suspension ended in March but he could not find a team after having been fired by Omega Pharma.

On May 19, 2013, Leipheimer admitted to The Press Democrat that he was "transitioning into the rest of my life." "I'm retired," he told them. "It's just been an 'unceremoniously' retired."

Personal life

He has supported the charity PETA in an advertising campaign.

On Tuesday, October 23, 2012, a feature-length documentary on Leipheimer's career entitled The Levi Effect: The Story of Levi Leipheimer was screened in select theaters in the United States.

Career achievements

Major results

All results from June 1, 1999 to July 30, 2006 and July 7 to 29, 2007 are stripped.

1995
 1st  Overall Tour de la Province de Namur
1997
 1st Stage 2 Cascade Cycling Classic
 1st Prologue Tour de Toona
1998
 1st  Overall Tour de Beauce
1st Stage 3
1999
 1st  Time trial, National Road Championships

 1st  Overall Tour de Beauce
1st Stage 3
 2nd Road race, Pan American Games
 3rd Sea Otter Classic
2000
 1st Stage 2 Circuit Franco-Belge
2001
 1st Stage 5 Redlands Bicycle Classic
1st Mountains Classification
 1st Stage 1 Sea Otter Classic
 2nd Overall Vuelta a Castilla y León
 3rd Overall Vuelta a España
2002
 1st  Overall Route du Sud
1st Stage 3 (ITT)
 8th Overall Tour de France
2003
 8th Overall Critérium du Dauphiné Libéré
2004
 1st Stage 4 Setmana Catalana de Ciclisme
 5th Overall Tour of the Basque Country
 8th Overall Critérium du Dauphiné Libéré
 9th Overall Tour de France
2005
 1st  Overall Deutschland Tour
1st  Mountains classification
1st Stage 4
 2nd Overall Tour de Georgia
 3rd Overall Critérium du Dauphiné Libéré
 6th Overall Tour de France
2006
 1st  Overall Critérium du Dauphiné Libéré
 2nd Overall Deutschland Tour
1st Stage 5
 6th Overall Tour of California
1st  Mountains classification
1st Prologue
  Combativity award Stage 18 Tour de France

2007
 1st  Road race, National Road Championships
 1st USA Cycling Professional Tour
 1st  Overall Tour of California
1st Prologue & Stage 5 (ITT)
 Tour de Georgia
1st Stage 4 (ITT) & 5
 1st Stage 3 (ITT) Tour of Missouri
 1st Copperopolis Road Race
 2nd Overall Deutschland Tour

 3rd Overall Tour de France
1st Stage 19 (ITT)

2008
 1st  Overall Tour of California
1st Stage 5 (ITT)
 1st  Overall Cascade Cycling Classic
 1st Clásica a los Puertos de Guadarrama
 2nd Overall Vuelta a España
1st Stage 5 & 20
 3rd Overall Critérium du Dauphiné Libéré
1st Prologue
 3rd Overall Tour de Georgia
 3rd  Time trial, Olympic Games
 4th Time trial, UCI Road World Championships
2009
 1st  Overall Tour of California
1st Stage 6 (ITT)
 1st  Overall Vuelta a Castilla y León
1st Stage 2 (ITT)
 1st  Overall Tour of the Gila
1st Stage 1 & 3 (ITT)
 1st Stage 4 (TTT) Tour de France
 1st Stage 2 Sea Otter Classic
 6th Overall initially, now 4th Giro d'Italia
2010
 1st  Overall Tour of the Gila
1st Stage 1
 1st  Overall Tour of Utah
1st Stage 2
 1st Leadville Trail 100 MTB (course record)
 3rd Overall Tour of California
2011
 1st  Overall USA Pro Cycling Challenge
1st Stage 1 & 3
 1st  Overall Tour de Suisse
 1st  Overall Tour of Utah
 2nd Overall Tour of California
1st Stage 7
 3rd Overall Vuelta a Andalucía
 5th Grand Prix Cycliste de Québec
 8th Overall Paris–Nice
2012
 1st  Overall Tour de San Luis
1st Stage 3 & 4 (ITT)
 3rd Overall Tour de Suisse
 3rd Overall USA Pro Cycling Challenge
 6th Overall Tour of California
 6th Overall Tour of Utah
1st Stage 6

General classification results timeline

Notes

References

External links

 Official site
 Levi Leipheimer Twitter page
 Levi Leipheimer USA Cycling biography
 The Levi Effect: The Story of Levi Leipheimer
 "Why I Doped", Wall Street Journal, October 2012

1973 births
American cycling road race champions
American male cyclists
American sportspeople in doping cases
American Vuelta a España stage winners
Cyclists at the 1999 Pan American Games
Cyclists at the 2004 Summer Olympics
Cyclists at the 2008 Summer Olympics
Doping cases in cycling
Living people
Medalists at the 2008 Summer Olympics
Olympic bronze medalists for the United States in cycling
Sportspeople from Butte, Montana
Sportspeople from Santa Rosa, California
Pan American Games medalists in cycling
Pan American Games silver medalists for the United States
Cyclists from California
Cyclists from Montana